Jorge Luis Deschamps Méndez (born 13 May 1984) is a Chilean professional footballer who plays as a goalkeeper for Primera División club C.D. Cobresal.

External links
 
 

1984 births
Living people
Chilean footballers
Ñublense footballers
C.D. Huachipato footballers
Cobresal footballers
Curicó Unido footballers
Everton de Viña del Mar footballers
Deportes Valdivia footballers
Naval de Talcahuano footballers
Deportes Concepción (Chile) footballers
San Marcos de Arica footballers
Chilean Primera División players
Primera B de Chile players
Association football goalkeepers